{{Speciesbox
| status = PE
| status_system = IUCN3.1
| status_ref = <ref name="iucn status 19 May 2022">{{cite iucn |author=Mercado Silva, N. |author2=Espinosa Pérez, H. |date=2019 |title=BChirostoma charari. The IUCN Red List of Threatened Species 2019: e.T191131A1970680 |volume=2019 |doi=10.2305/IUCN.UK.2019-2.RLTS.T191131A1970680.en |access-date=20 May 2022}}</ref>
| taxon = Chirostoma charari
| authority = de Buen, 1945
| synonyms = *Eslopsarum bartoni charari }}Chirostoma charari, the least silverside, is a species of neotropical silverside endemic to Mexico. This species has only been found in a spring in the Lake Cuitzeo basin on the Mesa Central of the Mexican Plateau. It has a longer head and jaw, as well as larger teeth and eyes than other Chirostoma'' species. Its status is rated as Critically Endangered by the IUCN, and may possibly be extinct.

References

charari
Freshwater fish of Mexico
Fish described in 1945
Fish of North America becoming extinct since 1500